Cristiano Novembre (born 15 June 1987) is an Italian footballer who plays as a goalkeeper for Serie D club Brindisi.

Club career

Youth career
Born in Brindisi, Apulia, Novembre started his career for Brindisi at the age of seven.
He remained at the club, with the youth system until 2003, when he transferred into the youth squad of Serie A side U.S. Lecce.

In July 2003, Novembre was signed by another team from Apulia, in the form of U.S. Lecce, where he played three seasons in the youths system. He remained with the club until 2006, when he transferred to Serie D side Fano. He never made a senior appearance for Lecce.

Debut
Novembre officially began his senior career with non-(fully)-professional club, Serie D side Fano, where he was the starting goalkeeper for the entire 2006–07 Serie D season, making 32 appearances. Following several impressive displays, Novembre was scouted by European powerhouse Juventus F.C., which won its historical Serie B champion title back to Serie A after relegation due to the 2006 Italian football scandal.

Juventus
In July 2007, Juventus F.C. officially offered a contract to Novembre. Juventus youth goalkeeper, Antonio Mirante was sent out on loan during that transfer window and hence, Novembre and Jess Vanstrattan were signed to provide extra cover for first choice Gianluigi Buffon and experienced backup Emanuele Belardi. Despite taking part in several friendly matches, as well as summer tournaments, Novembre spent the entire 2007–2008 season behind Buffon, Belardi, and Vanstrattan in the pecking order, partially due to his young age and lack of experience. In June 2008, Novembre was released.

Lega Pro
In July 2008, Novembre joined Figline as free agent, serving as a reserve to experienced goalie Stefano Pardini in his first season with the club. Novembre did make four league appearances in the first season for the Lega Pro Seconda Divisione Champions. In his second season with the club, Novembre continued to serve as a back-up to Pardini and made an additional seven appearances in the league.

Return to Serie D
On 10 December 2010, Novembre was signed by Serie D, Girone B side Caratese, following two disappointing seasons as a reserve for Figline. In June 2011 he was released. In September, Novembre returned to his hometown club, Brindisi. He left the club in November 2011 and returned to the hometown club in December 2012.

Personal life
Novembre holds a diploma in accountancy and has a sister Giada.

References

External links
 Profile at AIC.Football.it 
 Profile at La Gazzetta dello Sport 
 Serie D career at LaSerieD.com 

Italian footballers
U.S. Lecce players
Juventus F.C. players
Association football goalkeepers
People from Brindisi
1987 births
Living people
Footballers from Apulia
Sportspeople from the Province of Brindisi